The following is a list of notable events and releases of the year 1898 in Norwegian music.

Events

 June
 26 – The first Norwegian music festival was held in Bergen on initiative by Edvard Grieg (June 26 – July 3).

 Unknown date
 Olaus Alvestad publishes the songbook Norsk Songbok for Ungdomsskular og Ungdomslag.

Deaths

Births

 January
 5 – Rolf Gammleng, violinist and organizational leader (died 1984).

 June
 2 – Ola Isene, opera singer (baritone) and actor (died 1973).

 August
 7 – Eyvind Hesselberg, organist, composer, and conductor (died 1986).

 December
 4 – Reimar Riefling, classical pianist, music teacher, and music critic (died 1981).

See also
 1898 in Norway
 Music of Norway

References

 
Norwegian music
Norwegian
Music
1890s in Norwegian music